Cannabis in Zimbabwe is illegal except for licensed medical use, and possession may be punished with up to 12 years in jail. Cannabis may be called mbanje.

Reform
On Friday 27 April 2018 Zimbabwe became the second African country to legalize marijuana for medical and scientific purposes.

A press release published in Business Report last April 30, 2017 described how Zimbabweans are now allowed to “apply for licenses in growing cannabis specifically for medical and research.” The country's health minister, David Parirenyatwa released the new policies for licensing of individuals and enterprises to cultivate Mbanje. The duration of licenses is a maximum of five years and renewable allowing growers to own, sell, and transport cannabis in dried and oil forms. Applicants are required to state plans for the growing site along with quantity for production and selling as well as production period. The health minister has the prerogative not to approve a license if it causes risks in terms of public health and security.

The Zimbabwe Mail reported that ministers of parliament lobbied for the reduction of the “$50,000 license fee imposed on growers if they want to produce cannabis commercially.” According to these legislators, the fees are exorbitant and will lock out poor farmers in farms like [those in the] Binga District who have been growing marijuana illegally.

In 2017, Macro-Economic Planning and Investment Promotion Minister Dr Obert Mpofu noted that a Canadian firm had applied to cultivate medical cannabis in Zimbabwe, stating the government was "seriously considering" the application.

Farmers were offered 100% ownership of their land for the cultivation of medicinal marijuana in May 2020.

References

Zimbabwe
Drugs in Zimbabwe